The following is a list of all tournaments held as a part of the pool Euro Tour since its inception in 1992.

Tournament history

References

External links 
 

list
Cue sports related lists